Francisco Hernández (born 11 January 1988) is an Ex-Spanish rugby sevens player and captain. He was named in the Spanish squad for the 2016 Men's Rugby Sevens Final Olympic Qualification Tournament in Monaco, which they eventually lost. He was later named in the team to the 2016 Summer Olympics.

References

External links 
 

1988 births
Living people
Rugby sevens players at the 2016 Summer Olympics
Olympic rugby sevens players of Spain
Spain international rugby sevens players